Archibald C. McGowan (August 26, 1822 – February 20, 1893) was an American merchant and politician from New York.

Life
He was the son of Clark McGowan (died 1824) and Mary (Carpenter) McGowan (died 1824). He attended the district schools, and Jonesville Academy in Saratoga County, New York. About 1839, he began to work as a clerk in Troy, and in 1845 became a partner in a canal store in Clifton Park, and engaged in the coal and lumber trade. In 1846, he married Mary Louisa Rogers (1825–1897), and they had three children.

In 1854, he moved to Herkimer County, New York, and founded McGowansville (now East Frankfort). There he built a dry dock, opened a general store, ran canal boats, and became President of the Frankfort and Ilion Railroad.

He was a member of the New York State Assembly (Herkimer Co., 2nd D.) in 1863 and 1866; and of the New York State Senate (20th D.) from 1872 to 1875, sitting in the 95th, 96th, 97th and 98th New York State Legislatures.

He died on February 20, 1893, in Frankfort, New York, and was buried at the Oak Hill Cemetery in Herkimer.

Sources
 The New York Civil List compiled by Franklin Benjamin Hough, Stephen C. Hutchins and Edgar Albert Werner (1870; pg. 498 and 504)
 Biographical Sketches of the State Officers and the Members of the Legislature of the State of New York in 1862 and '63 by William D. Murphy (1863; pg. 364ff)

External links

1822 births
1893 deaths
Republican Party New York (state) state senators
Politicians from Troy, New York
Republican Party members of the New York State Assembly
People from Pownal, Vermont
19th-century American railroad executives
People from Clifton Park, New York
People from Frankfort, New York
19th-century American politicians